Jenny Mastoraki (born 1949) is a Greek poet and translator. She read Philology at the University of Athens.

She belongs to the Genia tou 70, a group of Greek authors who began publishing their work during the 1970s, especially towards the end of the Greek military junta of 1967-1974 and at the first years of the Metapolitefsi.

Poetry
 Διόδια (Tolls), 1972
 Το σόι (The kin), 1978
 Ιστορίες για τα βαθιά (Tales of the deep), 1983
 Μ' ένα στεφάνι φως (With a garland of light), 1989

Selected translations
Salinger, J. D., Ο φύλακας στη σίκαλη (The Catcher in the Rye), 1978
McCullers, Carson, Πρόσκληση σε γάμο (The Member of the Wedding),  1981
Canetti, Elias, Η τύφλωση (Die Blendung), 1985
Böll, Heinrich, Οι απόψεις ενός κλόουν  (Ansichten eines Clowns), 1986
Highet, Gilbert, Η κλασική παράδοση (The Classical Tradition), 1988
Poe, Edgar Allan, Λιγεία (Ligeia), 1991
Lewis, Clive Staples, Το άλογο και το αγόρι του (The horse and the boy), 1994
Kleist, Heinrich von, Οι μαριονέτες (Marionettes), 1996
Lewis, Clive Staples, Το λιοντάρι, η μάγισσα και η ντουλάπα (The lion, the witch and the wardrobe), 1999
Kane, Sarah, Καθαροί, πια (Cleansed), 2001
Kane, Sarah, Λαχταρώ, 2003 
Marx, Karl, Εγκώμιο του εγκλήματος, (Praise of murder), 2005 	
Machiavelli, Niccolo, Ο μανδραγόρας'', 2008

Notes

External links 
 A blog dedicated to her poetry
 Her page at the website of the Hellenic Authors' Society
 Her works at Kedros Publishers

1949 births
Living people
National and Kapodistrian University of Athens alumni
Greek women writers
Greek women poets
Writers from Athens